Zlatna Panega ("golden Panega",  also: Panega, old: Paneg, Altǎn Paneg)  is a river in central northern Bulgaria, originating from a karst source at the village of Zlatna Panega, Yablanitsa municipality, Lovech Province. During the Ottoman rule in Bulgaria (till 1878) it was known as "Altǎn Paneg". Zlatna Panega's source is the largest Karst source in Bulgaria and the water temperature is relatively constant throughout the year. Although the Zlatna Panega is only several dozen kilometres in length, it runs through the villages of Zlatna Panega, Rumyantsevo, Petrevene and the town of Lukovit before emptying into Iskar River. It is also very popular among Bulgaria's fishing community, as it is a great place to fish brown trout (with specimen over 1.5 kilograms), rainbow trout (some over 4 kilograms), chub, mountain barbel and even ide and perch.

Honour
Panega Glacier on Livingston Island in the South Shetland Islands, Antarctica is named after Zlatna Panega River.

See also
List of rivers of Bulgaria
Lukovit
Petrevene

References
 

Rivers of Bulgaria
Landforms of Lovech Province
Landforms of Pleven Province